Marco Carnesecchi (born 1 July 2000) is an Italian professional footballer who plays as a goalkeeper for  club Cremonese, on loan from Atalanta.

Club career

Atalanta
Carnesecchi started playing for the Under-19 squad of Atalanta in the 2017–18 season. He was first called up to the senior squad on 14 January 2019 for a 2018–19 Coppa Italia game against Cagliari, but remained on the bench.

Loan to Trapani
On 25 July 2019, Carnesecchi was loaned to the newly-promoted Serie B club Trapani. He made his professional Serie B debut for Trapani on 22 September 2019 in a game against Salernitana. He played the whole game.

Loan to Cremonese
On 5 January 2021, Carnesecchi was loaned to Serie B club Cremonese for the remainder of the 2020–21 season, having spent the first few months as an unused substitute at Atalanta. In his first season at Cremonese, Carnesecchi kept 8 clean sheets in 20 matches. His loan was subsequently extended for another season. On 31 August 2022, Carnesecchi returned to Cremonese on a new loan, with the club now in Serie A.

International career
Carnesecchi was first called up to represent his country for the under-17 squad in October 2016 and made his debut on 14 December 2016 in a friendly against Hungary. He was selected for Italy's 2017 UEFA European Under-17 Championship squad, but did not make any appearances behind first-choice Simone Ghidotti.

He was the first-choice goalkeeper for Italy at the 2019 UEFA European Under-19 Championship as the team was eliminated in the group stage.

At the 2019 FIFA U-20 World Cup, he made two appearances in the group game against Japan and the third-place game against Ecuador, backing up Alessandro Plizzari in other games.

On 6 September 2019, he made his debut for the Italy U21 squad in a friendly against Moldova.

On 24 January 2022, Carnesecchi accepted a call-up by Italy national team manager Roberto Mancini to join the Azzurri for a three-day training camp in Coverciano.

Personal life
On 6 October 2020, Carnesecchi tested positive for COVID-19.

Honours
Individual
UEFA European Under-21 Championship Team of the Tournament: 2021

References

External links
 

Living people
2000 births
Sportspeople from Rimini
Italian footballers
Footballers from Emilia-Romagna
Association football goalkeepers
Italy under-21 international footballers
Italy youth international footballers
Serie B players
Atalanta B.C. players
Trapani Calcio players
U.S. Cremonese players